The United Kingdom Census 1871 was a census of the United Kingdom of Great Britain and Ireland carried out on Sunday 2 April 1871. It added the categories of "lunatic" and "imbecile" to those recorded as infirm.

The total population of England, Wales and Scotland was recorded as 26,072,036.

See also
Census in the United Kingdom
List of United Kingdom censuses

References

1871
Census
April 1871 events